Castle Argyle Arms is a historic seven-story luxury apartment building in Hollywood, California. It was designed by San Francisco architect Leonard L. Jones in 1928.

History
In 1928, Dr. Alfred Guido Randolph "A. G." Castles demolished his personal estate, Sans Souci, on a three-acre plot at the intersection of Franklin Avenue and Argyle Avenue in Hollywood. In its place, he conscripted San Francisco architect Leonard L. Jones to design and construct the Castle Argyle Arms. Castles died five years later, but the Castle Argyle remained. After many decades of regular use, the building "deteriorated into a drug den" before being "broken up into small apartments for low-income tenants."

Legacy
As of 2020, the Castle Argyle still stands and is marketed as affordable senior living. Its "twin," the Hermoyne Apartments, also designed by Leonard L. Jones, likewise remains standing.

References

1928 establishments in California
Hotels established in 1928
Hotel buildings completed in 1928
Commercial buildings completed in 1928
Buildings and structures in Los Angeles